Poike is one of the three main extinct volcanoes that form Rapa Nui (Easter Island), a Chilean island in the Pacific Ocean. At 370 metres above sea level, Poike's peak is the island's second-highest point after the peak of the extinct volcano Terevaka.

Poike forms the eastern headland of Rapa Nui. An abrupt cliff known as the "Poike ditch" spans the island at the boundary between the respective lava flows from Poike and Terevaka. As the oldest of the island's three main volcanoes, Poike is the most weathered with relatively stoneless soil.

See also 
 List of volcanoes in Chile
 List of volcanoes in Pacific Ocean

References 
 
 Routledge, Katherine. 1919. The Mystery of Easter Island. The story of an expedition. London. 
 Van Tilburg, Jo Anne. 1994. Easter Island: Archaeology, Ecology and Culture. Washington D.C.: Smithsonian Institution Press.

External links 
 Guide to Easter Island from the Easter Island Foundation

Volcanoes of Easter Island
Extinct volcanoes
Polygenetic shield volcanoes
Pleistocene shield volcanoes